Cat Records was a short-lived subsidiary of Atlantic Records, specializing in rhythm and blues music. The label was founded in April 1954 to cash in on the popularity of R&B records among white teenager which were called "cat" records in the South, hence the name of the label. A total of 18 singles were released, on both 78 r.p.m. and 45 r.p.m. records, over nearly two years before the label was discontinued. Its biggest hit was "Sh-Boom" by The Chords. Other artists on the label included "Little" Sylvia Vanderpool and Mickey Baker, Floyd Dixon, Rose Marie McCoy, and Margie Day.

References

External links 
 Cat Records discography

Defunct record labels of the United States
Record labels established in 1954
Rhythm and blues record labels